Mary Prestidge (born 18 December 1948) is a British gymnast. She competed in five events at the 1968 Summer Olympics.

References

1948 births
Living people
British female artistic gymnasts
Olympic gymnasts of Great Britain
Gymnasts at the 1968 Summer Olympics
Sportspeople from London